Irish Willow was one of the few ships which maintained Irish trade during World War II.

At the outbreak of World War II, sometimes referred to in Ireland as "The Emergency", Ireland declared neutrality and became isolated as never before. Although Ireland had a substantial food surplus, there were shortages of specific foods such as fruits, wheat and tea.  There were very few Irish ships as shipping had been neglected since independence. Foreign ships which had transported Irish cargoes, before the war, were soon unavailable. 

Otto, an Estonian ship, was in Cobh when the Republic of Estonia was annexed by the USSR. In October 1941 trustees for the absent owners leased her to Irish Shipping. She was renamed Irish Willow, She made 18 voyages to Saint John, New Brunswick, returning with wheat. She also exported food to Britain and imported coal. Initially Irish ships sailed in British convoys. In the light of experience they chose to sail alone, relying on their neutral markings. German respect for that neutrality varied from friendly to tragic.

Construction
The ship was built as yard number 143 by the Toledo Shipbuilding Company, Toledo, Ohio, United States for the United States Shipping Board. A Standard World War I cargo ship, she was laid down as War Flag, but named Lake Sunapee after the lake in New Hampshire. She was launched on 28 December 1917, while World War I was still in progress. The engine was built by Toledo Shipbuilding.

Early history
As a Laker she was designed to navigate the canal locks bypassing Niagara Falls. Lake Sunapee served as a U.S. Army transport, based in Cardiff, Wales, bringing coal to France. She departed from Cardiff for New York City on 7 June 1919, arrived 25 June and was decommissioned at Hoboken, New Jersey 3 July 1919.

Little is known of her service in the years immediately following World War I, although it is recorded that she arrived at New York from the Pará on 29 May 1920. She was laid up until 1923 when she was sold to W. J. Gray Jnr. of San Francisco and renamed Frank Lynch. Frank Lynch was built as a coal-fired steamship with a triple-expansion steam engine. In 1923 the engine was replaced with a Werkspoor diesel engine. which had 8 cylinders of  diameter by  stroke. The engine was rated at 253nhp. It was built by the Pacific Diesel Engine Company, Oakland, California. On 29 August 1929, the passenger ship  collided with the tanker S.C.T. Dodd and sank with the loss of many lives. Frank Lynch, Munami and S.C.T. Dodd rescued the survivors.

In 1937, she was sold to the Greek company George D. Gratsos' Sons, who renamed her Nestor. In 1938 she suffered a total engine failure and was towed to Rotterdam, South Holland, Netherlands, where she was converted back to a steamship. A repacement triple expansion steam engine was fitted. It was made by John Lewis & Son, Aberdeen, United Kingdom. In 1939 she was sold to K. Jurnas of Estonia and renamed Otto.

World War II

Background
The Irish government had pursued a policy of autarky or self-sufficiency, so international trade was discouraged and the mercantile marine ignored. At independence in 1923 there were 127 Irish ships, but by September 1939 there were only 56, including 7 which did not carry cargo. Irish imports such as wheat, maize, timber and fertilizer were carried on foreign, mainly British, ships.  With the outbreak of hostilities, they were unavailable.  Churchill explained "we need this tonnage for our own supply".  In November 1939, American ships were excluded from Irish waters by the neutrality act. By the end of 1940, nine Irish ships
as well as ten neutral foreign ships carrying Irish cargoes, some of which had been chartered by Irish companies, had been sunk by U-boats, the Luftwaffe or mines.

Against this background, the government founded Irish Shipping and sought ships which it could charter or purchase. Irish Willow was one of those ships.

Soviet claim
In June 1940 the Soviet Union occupied the Baltic states and on 6 August 1940 Estonia was annexed as the Estonian Soviet Socialist Republic.  Industry was nationalised and Estonian ships were instructed to go to a Soviet port. There were several ships from the Baltic states in, or heading to, Irish ports.  All ignored that instruction. Peter Kolts, a crewman of Pirer, another Estonian ship at Dublin south quays, hoisted the hammer and sickle and prevented Captain Joseph Juriska from removing it. The Garda Síochána were called. Following a court appearance before Justice Michael Lennon the sailor spent a week in jail.

The twenty Estonian ships in British ports also received this telegram.  August Torma, the last Estonian envoy in London, presented their case to the Foreign Office and said that they needed reassurances if they were to stay in Britain. He failed to obtain reassurance. The majority went to the Soviet Union. Following the verdict of Justice Michael Lennon, the ships in Irish ports choose to remain.

Ivan Maisky, the Soviet ambassador to the United Kingdom, applied to the High Court in Dublin for possession of the ships. Their owners could not be contacted.  The Soviet case was supported by a letter from John Whelan Dulanty, the Irish High Commissioner in London.  This letter, written when the ships had been instructed to go immediately to the USSR, asked if the three ships carrying cargoes destined for Ireland,  could first deliver their Irish cargo.  Maisky had agreed on behalf of the Soviet Union, provided that the Irish government guaranteed that after discharging their cargo they would be given food sufficient for the journey to a Soviet port. A. K. Overend, KC, acting for Maisky, said that this established that his client was recognised by Ireland as "the proper person to give instruction to the ships", and that his client was the only claimant.

John McEvoy was the honorary consul of the Republic of Estonia in Dublin. He opposed the Soviet claim along with Estonian representatives in Switzerland. Though he lacked diplomatic status, the Court recognised the right of Herbert Martinson, described as "an Estonian national, resident in Switzerland", to vindicate the rights of the absent owners; McEvoy and Martinson were recognised as trustees for the owners.  The High Court considered five ships: three from Estonia, Otto, Piret and Mall, and two from Latvia, Rāmava and Everoja.  McEvoy acted for the various owners of the Estonian ships.  On 16 May 1941 the High Court rejected the Soviet claim.  The Soviet authorities appealed against the decision to the five-judge Supreme Court. On 3 July 1941 the appeal was unanimously dismissed with costs. The Soviet Union made a 'most emphatic' protest.

Martinson leased the three Estonian vessels to Irish Shipping for the duration of the war plus three months. The two Latvian ships transferred to the British registry and sailed under the Red Ensign. Rāmava moved to Britain. Everoja remained in Ireland.   Everoja was torpedoed and sunk on 3 November 1941 by  while in convoy SC-52 on passage from Canada to Dublin with 6,400 tons of wheat.

John McEvoy was acting at his own expense, but the court directed that he was to be reimbursed from the income earned by Otto (Irish Willow).  McEvoy's role was acknowledged by Estonia following its independence (the 'Singing Revolution'), when the President of Estonia Toomas Hendrik Ilves said: "... ... we are thankful that Ireland never recognised the illegal annexation of Estonia by the Soviet Union after the Second World War. We will never forget John McEvoy, Estonia's honorary consul in Dublin from 1938 to 1960. Among other things, one of his good deeds was helping to protect the interests of the Estonian shipowners ..."

Irish Willow
In October 1941, in Cobh, Otto was chartered by Irish Shipping. She was brought to Dublin for extensive repairs. On 5 December 1941, she made her first voyage as Irish Willow: She went from Cobh to Dublin under Captain G.R. Bryan, from Rathfarnam, previously captain of City of Dublin.  H. Cullen, previously of Irish Elm, was first officer. H. Jurgenson was chief engineer; he was an Estonian national, and had been the chief engineer when she was Otto. As engine components could not be located, the repairs had to be completed in Canada. On 5 December she went on her first commercial voyage, under Captain R Shanks of Belfast, as Irish Willow.  She went to Troon for fuel and then joined convoy ON-47.  The convoy departed on 15 December 1941. Around this time, Irish crews were refusing to travel in convoy.  Irish Willow "lost" her convoy.  She arrived in Saint John on 12 January 1942 and on 22 January loaded her cargo of wheat. Repairs delayed her a further two weeks. She was scheduled to return in convoy SC-68.  Returning alone, a submarine was spotted on 3 February. There was no contact. She unloaded her cargo of wheat in Waterford on 2 March and then went again for a further wheat cargo from Saint John for Waterford.  During the war, she completed 18 such voyages.

Encounter with U-753
On the morning of 16 March 1942,  sighted a lone ship, south-west of the Rockall Bank (Irish Willow), and prepared to sink her until they saw her neutral markings (the Irish tricolour and the word EIRE)  At 2 pm U-753 surfaced and signalled "send master and ship's papers". As Captain Shanks was born in Belfast and could be regarded as British, this was considered unwise.  Chief Officer Henry Cullen, with four crew as oarsmen went instead.  In the conning tower he explained that his captain was too elderly for the small boat.  He spoke about Ireland's neutrality. He reminded them that the next day would be Saint Patrick's Day. He sensed that he was making progress when tumblers of schnapps were produced in honour of Saint Patrick. But then the Germans – who seemed apologetic – said that they were awaiting instructions whether or not to sink the ship; they would, however, fire a red flare five minutes beforehand if they were to sink Irish Willow. Cullen and the oarsmen returned to their ship. They were given a bottle of cognac, to take back "for the crew". There was an anxious wait until eventually the U-boat fired a green flare.

Rescuing the crew of Empire Breeze 

Convoy ON 122  left Liverpool on 15 August 1942.  Ten days later, on 25 August 1942, when they were in the mid-Atlantic, the convoy was attacked by Wolfpack Lohs. Four ships were torpedoed and sunk.{{#tag:ref|
 Trolla (6 dead and 16 survivors), rescued by Norwegian corvette HNoMS Potentilla(K 214)
 Sheaf Mount (31 dead and 20 survivors), rescued by rescue ship Stockport Katvaldis (3 dead and 40 survivors) rescued by rescue ship Stockport Empire Breeze (1 dead and 47 survivors)|group=note}}
The fog continued to thicken.

 had hit the 7,457 ton  with two torpedoes. An SOS was transmitted and acknowledged. The 47 surviving crew abandoned ship and took to their three lifeboats. A fourth lifeboat was destroyed during launch. One crewman died Empire Breeze remained afloat. The rescue ship Stockport was detailed to rescue them. Stockport had failed to locate them in the fog, so she left to rejoin the convoy. There were three radio officers. They had a portable radio transmitter in a lifeboat. Repeated SOS messages were not acknowledged. Empire Breeze was still afloat. Captain Thomson and some of the crew re-boarded. The cook prepared hot meals. Joseph Brown, a radio officer, connected their portable radio with the ship's aerial and rebroadcast the SOS. This was heard and acknowledged by Belle Isle radio station in Canada. The rescue tug  and the corvette  were sent to rescue and, if possible, to salvage Empire Breeze. They failed to locate her or the survivors. A serious problem was that there had been fog for the previous few days, astronomical observations had not been taken, so no ship in the area knew their exact location. The various accounts of this event give different locations: www.wrecksite.eu (from the convoy report) has . Frank Forde's book (from the log of Irish Willow) quotes .

36 hours after the attack they sent another SOS. Irish Willow heard this SOS, she responded and headed towards the scene. Irish Willow replied, asking how long they could hold out. Captain Thomson of Empire Breeze estimated six hours. Captain Shanks of Irish Willow replied "Coming to you – with you in about five hours".  The fog became denser and visibility reduced to zero. Rather than plotting locations, (dead reckoning) Irish Willow was using direction finding equipment; she was travelling towards the SOS signal: It was dangerous for Irish Willow. They knew the direction to take, but did not know the distance. Travelling in fog, they could collide with Empire Breeze, or endanger survivors in the water. Extra look-outs were posted along her bow and whistles were sounded every two minutes. The repeating SOS messages could attract U-boats, seeking to "finish the job", and if such a U-boat found Irish Willow at the scene, its attitude could be quite different to that encountered on 16 March.

In dense fog the survivors were located and rescued. Irish Willow resumed her voyage to Waterford. As they rounded Hook Lighthouse they were met by the RNLI lifeboat Annie-Blanche-Smith from Dunmore East with an advance party of doctors and Red Cross volunteers.  The Dunmore East Parish Hall had been  converted into a reception centre.  A full team of Red Cross volunteers had arrived from Waterford.  Hot meals and medical facilities were awaiting the survivors. It was decided to land the survivors at Dunmore East, while Irish Willow continued to Waterford.  Two were taken by ambulance to Waterford Infirmary with fever.

On 4 September 1942, the Munster Express published an interview with Captain Thomson "We are very pleased to land in Eire, and we certainly could not have found a better landing".

Post war service
In May 1946 Irish Willow was returned to Egon Jurgenson. She was sold to Cia. de Vapores Veraguas and renamed Veraguas with a Panamanian registry. She continued to trade for a further 14 years. At the end of her 42-year career she was scrapped at Tamise, Belgium in July 1960.

LegacyIrish Willow rescued the 47 survivors from Empire Breeze. Throughout the war, Irish ships answered SOS calls and stopped to rescue, irrespective of nationality, and frequently – as in this instance – at risk to themselves.  Ships in convoy were, usually, forbidden from stopping to rescue, lest they then became a target. The Empire Breeze crew were in their lifeboats when Athelprince, with the convoy commodore aboard, had to alter course to avoid collision with the abandoned Empire Breeze,  but did not stop to rescue the crew.  Irish ships rescued, at least, 534 seafarers during the war.

Before the war, Irish Shipping Ltd did not exist. Its 15 ships were not under the Irish Flag.  During the war, they imported more than a million tons of essential supplies: 712,000 tons of wheat; 178,000 tons of coal; 63,000 tons of phosphate (fertilizer); 24,000 tons of tobacco; 19,000 tons of newsprint; 10,000 tons of lumber; and over 100,000 tons of more than 500 types of other goods.  (This is in addition to the imports carried by other Irish ships)

On 16 May 1945, a week after VE Day Éamon de Valera addressed the nation: 

In June 1946 a contract was signed with John Redhead and Sons, shipbuilders of South Shields to construct a new Irish Willow.

See also

 Irish neutrality during World War II – international relations in World War II
 Irish Mercantile Marine during World War II
 Battle of the Atlantic
Other ships operated by Irish Shipping during World War II
 
 
 
Other Irish ships operating during World War II
 Innisfallen''

Notes

References

Bibliography

Books

Journal
  Newsletter Magazine of Irish Shipping Ltd
 

1917 ships
Ships built in Toledo, Ohio
Standard World War I ships
World War I merchant ships of the United States
Transport ships of the United States Army
Steamships of the United States
Merchant ships of the United States
Steamships of Greece
Merchant ships of Greece
Steamships of Estonia
Merchant ships of Estonia
World War II merchant ships of Estonia
Steamships of the Republic of Ireland
World War II merchant ships of the Republic of Ireland
Maritime incidents in March 1942
Independent Ireland in World War II
Maritime history of Ireland
Steamships of Panama
Merchant ships of Panama
Ireland–Soviet Union relations
Ships built by the Toledo Shipbuilding Company